Southgate Road is a street in London, England, that runs from Baring Street in the south to the junction with Mildmay Park and Ball's Pond Road in the north. The street forms a part of the B102 road, leading from Newington Green to The City. The west side of Southgate Road is in the London Borough of Islington; and the east side is in the London Borough of Hackney.

Joseph Stalin, Vladimir Lenin and Leon Trotsky visited Southgate Road for the 5th Congress of the Russian Social Democratic Labour Party in 1907, which was held at the Brotherhood Church which once stood on the northern corner of Southgate Road and Balmes Road. 

In the 1950s the area was a popular area for musicians and artists, so much so that Salvador Dalí and Buddy Holly opened a short lived nightclub called the Loyala on the corner on Balls Pond Road. It closed down after three months due to the lack of a licence.

Today, a number of new developments are assisting in the regeneration of the area.

Transport
Southgate Road has three main bus routes that provide residents direct routes into the City and West end as well as the outer London areas.

 21: Newington Green - Lewisham
 76: Tottenham Hale station - Waterloo
 141: Palmers Green - London Bridge station

Nearest London Underground stations:

Northern line
- Angel tube station
- Old Street tube station

Victoria line
- Highbury & Islington station

Nearest National Rail station:
First Capital Connect
-  Essex Road station
-  Highbury & Islington station
-  Old Street station

London Overground
- Dalston Junction
- Dalston Kingsland
- Haggerston
- Canonbury
- Highbury & Islington

Nearest areas
 Angel
 Canonbury
 De Beauvoir Town
 Finsbury
 Highbury
 Hoxton
 Mildmay
 Newington Green

Streets in the London Borough of Hackney
Streets in the London Borough of Islington